Murexsul ianlochi is a species of sea snail, a marine gastropod mollusk in the family Muricidae, that include murex snails and rock snails.

Description

Distribution

References

External links
 Houart R. (1987 ["1986") Description of three new muricid gastropods from the south-western Pacific Ocean with comments on new geographical data. Bulletin du Muséum National d'Histoire Naturelle, ser. 4, section A, 8(4): 757–767]

Muricidae
Gastropods described in 1986